The 1963 Yugoslav First Basketball League season was the 19th season of the Yugoslav First Basketball League. The season ended with OKK Beograd winning the league championship, ahead of KK Partizan.

The season began during June 1963 following the end of the 1963 FIBA World Championship in Brazil where the Yugoslav national team won silver, its first-ever medal at the FIBA World Championship. The national team success led to an increased level of interest in basketball throughout the country as the public eagerly awaited another showdown between the main title contenders — OKK Beograd led by twenty-four-year-old power forward Radivoj Korać and KK Olimpija whose on-court leader was twenty-five-year-old point guard Ivo Daneu.

Notable events

Early games
The season opened at the outdoor court in Zadar in front of packed stands with 3,500 spectators as the home team, KK Zadar, took on visitors Lokomotiva Zagreb and won 88-78 behind Željko Troskot's 30 points who thus managed to overshadow the Yugoslav national team members on the floor — his Zadar teammate Pino Djerdja as well as Lokomotiva's Džimi Petričević (29 points) and Dragan Kovačić (19 points).

KK Zadar continued the early part of the season in furious fashion, beating KK Partizan away in Belgrade followed by facing defending champion KK Olimpija away in front of 4,000 fans in Ljubljana — Olimpija (without their injured best player Ivo Daneu) led 51-37 at the half behind Matija Dermastija's scoring before Zadar managed a complete comeback in the second half for a 97-100 final with Djerdja recording 37 points while Dermastija ended up with 29 points.

In contrast to Zadar's red hot early form, defending champion Olimpija performed way below expectations due to Daneu's injury absence, recording three losses in their first four games of the season. Olimpija's early-season losses included a 99-90 defeat away at KK Partizan whose sharpshooter Miloš Bojović scored 35 points while Bata Radović added 12.

Classification 

The winning roster of OKK Beograd:
  Radivoj Korać
  Milorad Erkić
  Slobodan Gordić
  Miodrag Nikolić
  Trajko Rajković
  Dragutin Tošić
  Bruno Pavelić
  Ljubomir Stanković
  Momčilo Pazman
  Branko Kosović
  Miodrag Ivačković
  Dušan Gajin
  Siniša Duboka
  Slobodan Miloradović

Coach:  Aleksandar Nikolić

Scoring leaders
 Radivoj Korać (OKK Beograd) – 621 points (34.5 ppg)
 ???
 ???

Qualification in 1963-64 season European competitions 

FIBA European Champions Cup
 OKK Beograd (champions)

References

Yugoslav First Basketball League seasons